The Carl and Esther Lee House is a historic house at 17493 United States Route 65 West in Damascus, Arkansas.  It is a -story wood-frame structure, with a stone veneer exterior and cream-colored brick trim.  The front facade has projecting gable sections, with a porch sheltered by one such section with curved-arch openings.  The larger gables have sunburst brick designs near their peaks.  The house was built about 1948; the exterior stonework was done by Silas Owens, Sr., a regionally prominent stonemason.  The house exhibits many of Owens's hallmarks, including the use of cream-colored brick, herringbone-patterned stonework, and arched openings.

The house was listed on the National Register of Historic Places in 2005.

See also
National Register of Historic Places listings in Van Buren County, Arkansas

References

Houses on the National Register of Historic Places in Arkansas
Tudor Revival architecture in the United States
Houses completed in 1948
National Register of Historic Places in Van Buren County, Arkansas
1948 establishments in Arkansas
Houses in Van Buren County, Arkansas